Pa'lante is a Spanish contraction of . Pa'lante, or variants, may refer to:

Music

Albums
Pa'lante, by Willy Chirino
Pa'lante! Straight!, by Tito Puente
Echao Pa'lante, by Joe Arroyo and La Verdad
Echando Pa'lante (Straight Ahead), by Eddie Palmieri
Straight Ahead (Pa'lante), by Poncho Sanchez

Songs
"Pa'lante", a song by Joelma from the album Joelma
"Pa'lante", a song by Hurray for the Riff Raff from the album The Navigator

Other
 Pa'lante, a newspaper of the Young Lords New York chapter

See also
 Palante, France
 Pallante, a surname